Jamod is a small town in Jalgaon. Jamod taluka in the Buldhana district of Maharashtra.

The name "Jamod" comes from Jaha moze, which means place of enjoyment. Its old name was Virat Nagari. Jamod is situated on the base of the Satpuda hills, which means seven hills together. Jamod has good fertile land for growing bananas, vegetables, and oranges, and all nearby villages are situated on hills. The Avji Sidha Maharaj temple is one of the few famous places around Jamod.

Demographics
Generally the Bari caste is located here, which are the farmers of eating leaves (Nagveli). Every year these people arrange bhandara (common food party) at Bambleshwari (Mahadeo) temple.

Religion
There are many Hindu temples, including Shri Ram temple, Hanuman temple, Mahadev temple, Janai-Muktai temple, Gajanan Maharaj temple, Indradev temple, Shani Maharaj temple, Balaji temple. There is also a very old Jain temple and a Bembleshwar (mahadeo) temple. Indra dev temple is present only in Jamod in all world.

Education
 The New Life English convent school
 Jana-Muktai primary high school 
 Janta Vidyalaya Jamod
 Marathi Purv Madhymik Shala Jamod
Educational Revolution Academy (Pravin R. Randale's ERA)
The Holy Jamody Church

External links
 http://www.jamod.in
 Official facebook page

References 

Cities and towns in Buldhana district